Thermoleophilum is a genus of Actinomycetota.

References

Actinomycetota